Frank Beard is an American United Methodist Church bishop serving the Illinois Great Rivers Conference.

Beard was elected to the episcopacy July 13, 2016 at the North Central Jurisdiction quadrennial meeting at Peoria, Illinois.

Biography

Education 
Beard received his B.A. Degree from Taylor University, in Upland, Indiana in 1979.  In 1982, he received his M.Div. Degree from Asbury Theological Seminary in Wilmore, Kentucky.  In 1986, Beard was awarded a S.T.M. Degree from Christian Theological Seminary in Indianapolis, Indiana. He received a D.Min. Degree from Asbury in 1997.

Personal life 
Beard is married to Melissa Kay Riffell. They have two children: Eleanor Lee and Emily Beard.

Ordained ministry
Postings: 
 Castleton United Methodist Church, Indianapolis, Indiana | 2012 – 2016
 Kokomo District Superintendent | 2004 – 2012
 Warsaw Walnut Creek UMC, Warsaw, Indiana | 1997 – 2004
 Elkhart Faith UMC, Associate, Elkhart, Indiana | 1993 – 1997
 Kokomo Beamer UMC, Kokomo, Indiana | 1986 – 1993
 Anderson New Hope UMC, Anderson, Indiana | 1982 – 1986

References

American United Methodist bishops
Living people
Year of birth missing (living people)